The Dorëzi Fortress is situated close to Dorëz village in Albania, 5 km east of Pezë and 20 km southwest of Tirana. It is the oldest in the Tirana County and dates to the 9th century BC.

History
The first archaeological expedition was performed in 1951. It is thought that Dimale may have been situated in the Dorëzi Fortress. The fortress construction seems to have had three phases—the first with raw stones, the second with carved blocks placed with no mortar (Hellenistic period) and the third with crushed stones and the use of mortar (4th–6th centuries AD). One can see the main entrance of the fortress. The presence of old vases that date to those centuries suggests that the site was inhabited until at least the 4th–6th centuries AD.

References

Castles in Albania
Buildings and structures in Tirana

Tourist attractions in Tirana
Buildings and structures completed in the 9th century BC